Wavves is an American rock band based in San Diego, California. Formed in 2008 by singer-songwriter Nathan Williams (born June 12, 1986), the band also features Alex Gates (guitar, backing vocals), Stephen Pope (bass guitar, backing vocals) and Ross Traver (drums and backing vocals).

History

Early years and early releases (2008–2009) 
Wavves started in 2008 as the recording project of Nathan Williams. Wavves released several 7"s as well as a cassette leading up to the first release, Wavves. After gaining recognition, Ryan Ulsh was enlisted as a touring drummer and Wavves embarked on their first US and European tours. Wavves released their self-titled debut album in 2008, subsequently drawing the attention of Pitchfork Media. At the time, the band consisted of guitarist Nathan Williams and drummer Ryan Ulsh, who replaced Baby Animal during production. Their second full-length album, Wavvves, was released on February 3, 2009, and was well received by outlets such as Spin, The A.V. Club, and Pitchfork.

Singer Nathan Williams experienced a public breakdown as the band was unable to complete their set at the 2009 Barcelona Primavera Sound Festival. Williams, who admitted he had taken a cocktail of ecstasy and Valium, fought with drummer Ryan Ulsh and insulted the Spanish crowd, who then pelted him with bottles. Apologizing for their performance, Williams admitted the next day that he was addicted to alcohol. As a result, the band cancelled the remainder of their European tour. When Ulsh quit the band, Zach Hill replaced him as the drummer of Wavves for a brief time. Two members formerly of the late Jay Reatard's band, drummer Billy Hayes and bassist Stephen Pope, joined Wavves in November 2009. Williams also reported that an album featuring Zach Hill on drums was to be expected towards the end of 2010, along with a possible EP featuring Hayes and Pope.

King of the Beach, Life Sux (2010–2011) 
The third Wavves album, titled King of the Beach, was released on August 3, 2010, by Fat Possum Records. It featured the new lineup of Nathan Williams, Billy Hayes, and Stephen Pope. Produced by Grammy-winning producer Dennis Herring at Sweet Tea in Mississippi, the album received generally positive reviews from the likes of Paste Magazine, Dusted Magazine, and The Onion's A.V. Club. The album received an average of 72 out of 100 on Metacritic, based on 26 critics reviews. The album was named the 24th-best album of the year by Spin, and the 50th best album of the year by Pitchfork. The group's single "Post Acid" was featured in a 3-minute and fifty second promotional cartoon called: "Scott Pilgrim vs. the Animation"

Wavves released a new EP, Life Sux, in September 2011. It consisted of eight tracks, including cameos from Bethany Cosentino and Bobb Bruno from Best Coast, as well as Damian Abraham from Fucked Up. The album also contains a live track "In the Sand". Billy Hayes left Wavves in November 2010 and was replaced by Jacob Cooper, formerly of The Mae Shi. This is the first album the band had released on its own label, Ghost Ramp.

In 2011, Wavves made a guest appearance in the short-lived MTV animated series, Good Vibes, performing their songs "King of the Beach," "Bug," and "I Wanna Meet Dave Grohl".

Afraid of Heights (2012–2014) 
Wavves appeared on Big Boi's Vicious Lies and Dangerous Rumors, on the song "Shoes for Running," which was released December 11, 2012.

On December 12, 2012, Wavves released a music video for their song "Sail to the Sun." Nathan Williams announced the release on his Twitter. Wavves released their fourth studio album, Afraid of Heights, on March 26, 2013, on Mom + Pop Music. The album peaked at #81 on the Billboard 200, the band's highest charting album to date. Still in Rock ranked the album third best of 2013. The second single from the album, "Demon to Lean On", reached #36 on Billboard's Alternative Songs chart. The band also made their network television debut on the Late Show with David Letterman, performing "Demon to Lean On".

In contribution to the Grand Theft Auto V soundtrack, "Nine Is God" was produced exclusively for the in-game radio station Vinewood Boulevard Radio, 'hosted' Nathan & Stephen. The band performed the song on Conan in support of the game. Not to mention that the opening notes of "Dog" can also be heard in the game during the introduction of the "Third Way" ending.

No Life For Me and V (2015–2016) 
In early January 2015, Nathan Williams had announced that Wavves would be releasing both a fifth studio album and a collaboration album with Cloud Nothings during summer of 2015.

In April 2015, Wavves contributed the song "Leave" on Welcome to Los Santos, a collaboration album consisting of musicians featured in Grand Theft Auto V. The album was later added to the soundtrack of the game. Wavves' collaboration album with Cloud Nothings titled No Life for Me was released on June 28 in Europe and was released worldwide the next day through Ghost Ramp.

On July 16, 2015, "Way Too Much", the first single from Wavves' fifth studio album, V, was released. On July 31, "Flamezesz", the second single from the album was released; on August 12, the third single was released, called "Heavy Metal Detox"; on August 31, Wavves released their fourth glimpse into their upcoming album, with "My Head Hurts" via Beats 1 webcast. After a turbulent production, V was released on October 2, 2015, to generally positive reviews. V scored a 6.5 on the music site Pitchfork. The album received a score of 78 on Metacritic, based on 11 reviews, which is the highest score the band has received on the site. Still in Rock ranked it as the 5th best album of 2015.

In December 2015, Wavves announced that they would embark on another North American tour with Best Coast and Cherry Glazerr, titled the Summer is Forever II Tour, in support of V, in February and March 2016.

You're Welcome (2017–2021) 
In late December 2016, Wavves announced via Twitter a new album due on May 19, 2017. The band is also set to perform as opening acts, alongside The Naked and Famous, in Blink-182's 2017 spring tour which would visit mostly the southern United States. The band released the album, titled You're Welcome, early on May 19, 2017, for free streaming. They toured with Dune Rats in Australia in September 2017 and continued on a headlining tour to promote the new album in North America in October.

On December 13, 2018, Nathan Williams posted on his Instagram that Brian Hill was playing his last show with Wavves that night at the Fillmore in San Francisco.

On December 19, 2019, Wavves teased a new record on their Instagram.

The band celebrated the 10-year anniversary of King of The Beach with tours in Australia and North America in Spring 2020.

Hideaway (2021–present) 

On March 30, 2021, Wavves released the single, "Sinking Feeling", and released "Help Is on the Way" on May 4, 2021. On the same day, the band announced on their Instagram page that their seventh studio album Hideaway is set to be released on July 16, 2021. Stephen Pope also announced the upcoming studio album on his Instagram as well. The album was officially released on July 16, 2021, by Fat Possum Records and received positive and mixed reviews.

Musical style 
Since the band's third album King of the Beach, Wavves' style has primarily been described as alternative rock and indie rock; the band has also been described as pop-punk, punk rock, and surf rock.

Members 
Current members
Nathan Williams – lead vocals, guitar (2008–present)
Stephen 'Stevie' Pope – bass guitar, backing vocals (2009–present)
Alex Gates – guitar, backing vocals (2011–present)
Ross Traver – drums, backing vocals (2019–present)
Former and touring members
 Ryan Ulsh – drums (2008–2009)
 Zach Hill – drums (2009)
Billy Hayes – drums, backing vocals (2009–2010)
Jacob Cooper – drums (2010–2013)
 Brian Hill – drums (2013–2018), backing vocals (2016–2018)

Timeline

Discography 

Studio albums
Wavves (2008)
Wavvves (2009)
King of the Beach (2010)
Afraid of Heights (2013)
V (2015)
You're Welcome (2017)
Hideaway (2021)

References

External links 

American musical trios
Fat Possum Records artists
Musical groups from San Diego
Indie rock musical groups from California
Surf music groups
Musical groups established in 2008
Pop punk groups from California
Punk rock groups from California
Mom + Pop Music artists
Bella Union artists